Kuju is a census town in the Mandu CD block in the Ramgarh subdivision of the Ramgarh district in the Indian state of Jharkhand.

Geography

Location
It has an average elevation of 426 metres (1397 feet).

Area overview
Ramgarh has a vibrant coal-mining sector. The map alongside provides links to five operational areas of Central Coalfields spread across South Karanpura Coalfield, Ramgarh Coalfield and West Bokaro Coalfield. Four of the six CD blocks in the district have coal mines – Patratu, Ramgarh, Mandu and Chitarpur. The high concentration of census towns in these blocks are noticeable on the map. Only two blocks, Gola and Dulmi, are totally rural areas. Ramgarh district lies in the central part of the Chota Nagpur Plateau. The Damodar valley covers most of the district. The forested areas in highlands to the north and the south of the valley can be seen in the map (mark the shaded areas). "Chotanagpur has a charm of its own… The entire area forms one of the most charming series of views imaginable. The far-off hills in the background in exquisite tints of blue or purple as the light falls, the nearer hills picturesquely shaped and luxuriant in every shade of green with their bold escarpments in black or grey, and the brown plains below furnishing their quota of colours." 

Note: The map alongside presents some of the notable locations in the district. All places marked in the map are linked in the larger full screen map.

Demographics
According to the 2011 Census of India, Kuju had a total population of 21,356, of which 11,246 (53%) were males and 10,110 (47%) were females. Population in the age range 0-6 years was 3,123. The total number of literate persons in Kuju was 14,365 (78.79% of the population over 6 years).

 India census, Kuju had a population of 18,049. Males constitute 54% of the population and females 46%. Kuju has an average literacy rate of 60%, higher than the national average of 59.5%: male literacy is 69%, and female literacy is 50%. In Kuju, 15% of the population is under 6 years of age.

Civic administration
There is a Police Outpost at Kuju.

Infrastructure
According to the District Census Handbook 2011, Ramgarh, Kuju covered an area of 13.483 km2. Among the civic amenities, it had 10 km roads with open  drains, the protected water supply involved uncovered wells, hand pumps. It had 3,526 domestic electric connections, 10 road lighting points. Among the medical facilities, it had 1 hospital, 2 dispensaries, 2 health centres, 1 family welfare centre, 11 maternity and child welfare centres, 11 maternity homes, 5 nursing homes, 14 medicine shops. Among the educational facilities it had 8 primary schools, 5 middle schools, 2 secondary schools, 1 senior secondary school, the nearest general degree college at Ramgarh Cantonment 11 km away. It had  6 non-formal educational centres (Sarva Siksha Abhiyan). Among the social, recreational and cultural facilities it had 1 stadium, 1 auditorium/ community hall. Three important commodities it produced were coal, chuna, spunz. It had the branch offices of 3 nationalised banks, 1 agricultural credit society, 1 non-agricultural credit society.

Economy
Projects in the Kuju Area of Central Coalfields Limited (as in 2015) were: Surubera Underground and Open Cast, Ara OC, Kuju UG, Topa UG & OC, Pindra UG & OC, Pundi OC and Karma OC.

Transport
There is a station at Kuju on the Koderma–Hazaribagh–Barkakana–Ranchi line.

Kuju is on National Highway 33.

Healthcare 
Medistyle pain clinic & diagnostics located on the Main Road is integral healthcare service provider in the region.

References

Cities and towns in Ramgarh district